William Lloyd Prosser (March 15, 1898 – 1972) was the Dean of the School of Law at UC Berkeley from 1948 to 1961. Prosser authored several editions of Prosser on Torts, universally recognized as the leading work on the subject of tort law for a generation. It is still widely used today, now known as Prosser and Keeton on Torts, 5th edition. Furthermore, in the 1950s, Dean Prosser became Reporter for the Second Restatement of Torts.

Biography
After spending his first year at Harvard Law School, Prosser transferred to and received his law degree from the University of Minnesota Law School. After a brief time in private practice at Dorsey, Colman, Barker, Scott & Barber (the modern-day Dorsey & Whitney), he became a professor of law at the University of Minnesota Law School, where he wrote Prosser on Torts.  He taught there from 1931 until 1940, when he resigned to become the Minnesota counsel for the Roosevelt Administration's Office of Price Administration. In 1943, he returned to private practice for another four years. In 1947, Prosser returned to Harvard Law School as a professor. The following year, Prosser became Dean of the School of Jurisprudence at UC Berkeley. The unusual name of Berkeley's law school was a leftover from its beginnings as an undergraduate department, but had not been changed because of existing statutory language designating the Hastings College of Law as the University of California's "law department."  After Prosser learned that UCLA had been able to get legislative approval for its own "school of law" (notwithstanding the Hastings statutory language), he decided that Berkeley could also get away with having its own school of law and set about getting the school renamed. In 1961, Prosser left Berkeley to teach at Hastings, where he remained until his death in 1972.

In a small exhibit about the Levering Act loyalty oath in the ground level of the Campanile at UC Berkeley, Prosser is quoted as saying, "If the authority exists to discharge a professor because he will not sign this oath on demand, then it exists to fire him because he will not sign an oath that he is not a Catholic, not a Mason, not a consumer of beer ... there is no place to stop."

Prosser and strict products liability 
Prosser became closely associated with the doctrine of strict liability for products injuries. His first edition of Prosser on Torts in 1941 argued that strict products liability was developing in American law, and predicted that it would be the law of the future.  By the time his influential article The Assault on the Citadel (Strict Liability to the Consumer) was published in 1960, the New Jersey Supreme Court fulfilled his prediction, holding in Henningsen v. Bloomfield Motors that manufacturers implicitly warrantied their products against personal injury to all users. As Reporter for the Second Restatement of Torts, he helped codify strict products liability in the Restatement's Section 402A.

In the early 1940s, Prosser prepared the Comments and Notes to the predecessor of the Uniform Commercial Code: Commercial Code, Tentative Draft No. 1 – Article III.  His work was limited to sections 1–51 of Article III, which focused primarily on commercial paper.

References

20th-century American lawyers
American legal writers
American legal scholars
Scholars of tort law
Deans of UC Berkeley School of Law
UC Berkeley School of Law faculty
Harvard Law School faculty
University of Minnesota Law School faculty
University of Minnesota faculty
University of Minnesota Law School alumni
Harvard Law School alumni
California lawyers
Minnesota lawyers
People from New Albany, Indiana
1898 births
1972 deaths
20th-century American academics